Khwaabb is a 2014 Indian Hindi-language romance and drama film directed by Zaid Ali Khan and produced by Moraad Ali Khan under the banner of Bullseye Productions. It stars Navdip Singh and Simar Motiani. The film's soundtrack was composed by Sandeep Chowta and Sajjad Ali Chandwani. It was released worldwide on 9 May 2014.

The story revolves around the lives of two athletes: their struggles, their dreams and their aspirations.

The official trailer of Khwaabb was unveiled on 23 August 2013 at Delhi. Upon being released on the net on the following day, the trailer got  views in 10 days.

Khwaabb was initially supposed to be released in October 2012. However, it was later postponed to 9 May 2014.

Plot 
Sanjay Kumar (Navdip Singh) live a life dealing with his alcoholic father and is in love with Kiran Missra (Simer Motiani), who belong to the same village. While Kiran is an ace swimmer, Sanjay can run pretty fast. Soon an idealistic coach of the sports academy, Ram Prasad Lakshman (Bajrangbali Singh) spots the two and brings them to his academy.

Kiran makes the most of this opportunity and works hard on her talent, while Sanjay only has eyes on her. He gets irritated watching Kiran with a rich brat Sameer (Rishi Miglani). When Kiran slaps him publicly, he starts drinking heavily. The coach rebukes Sanjay for not focusing on his career and pulls him to the field to get successful first. Both Kiran and Sanjay train hard and goes on to win the National championships.

Kiran's ordeals begin when she fails the dope test and watches her world fall apart. Sanjay consoles her and soon Kiran begins her new life while training harder under the guidance of Nafisa Ali. She qualifies for a world championship in Dubai. However, the sports officials use up the allocated budget, who are more interested in taking their families on vacation to Dubai or having fun. They notify all the qualified participants to deposit Rs. . After the corporates turn their back on funding her, Sanjay comes to the rescue again and arranges money for her. But in the process, he finds short of the money to be deposited for himself. He has to stay back while Kiran goes on to win the world championships.

Cast 
 Navdip Singh as Sanjay Kumar
 Simer Motiani as Kiran Missra
 Bajrangbali Singh as Ram Prasad Lakshman
 Rishi Miglani as Sameer
 Apeksha Verma as Archie
 Nafisa Ali as Herself
 Jeetendr.Gupta as Rihipal
 Dhirendra Gupta as Nathalal
 Vaibhav Bhisht as Immamudim
 Abbas Ali Khan as Sanjay's father 
 Manoj Bakshi as Baldev Singh

Music 

The music launch was done by Salman Khan on 28 March 2014 where he stated his interest in producing a sports-based movie. Music of Khwaabb has been composed by Sandeep Chowta and Sajjad Ali Chandwani. The soundtrack album consists of three tracks.

Track listing

References

External links 
 

2010s Hindi-language films
Indian romantic drama films
Indian sports drama films
2014 films
2014 romantic drama films
2010s sports drama films